Aleksandre Amisulashvili (born 20 August 1982 in Tbilisi) is a retired Georgian international footballer.

Career
In June 2014 Amisulashvili signed for Inter Baku in Azerbaijan. Previously he played for Krylia Sovetov.

Career statistics

International goals
Scores and results list Georgia's goal tally first.

References

External links

FC Dinamo Tbilisi official Profile

1982 births
Living people
Footballers from Georgia (country)
Georgia (country) international footballers
Georgia (country) under-21 international footballers
Expatriate footballers from Georgia (country)
FC Dinamo Tbilisi players
FC Dnipro players
SC Tavriya Simferopol players
FC Shinnik Yaroslavl players
PFC Spartak Nalchik players
Kayserispor footballers
FC Krasnodar players
PFC Krylia Sovetov Samara players
Expatriate footballers in Ukraine
Expatriate footballers in Russia
Expatriate footballers in Turkey
Russian Premier League players
Ukrainian Premier League players
Süper Lig players
Erovnuli Liga players
Expatriate sportspeople from Georgia (country) in Ukraine
Expatriate sportspeople from Georgia (country) in Russia
Expatriate sportspeople from Georgia (country) in Turkey
Association football defenders
Expatriate sportspeople from Georgia (country) in Azerbaijan